In the fields of mechanism design and social choice theory, Gibbard's theorem is a result proven by philosopher Allan Gibbard in 1973. It states that for any deterministic process of collective decision, at least one of the following three properties must hold:
 The process is dictatorial, i.e. there exists a distinguished agent who can impose the outcome;
 The process limits the possible outcomes to two options only;
 The process is open to strategic voting: once an agent has identified their preferences, it is possible that they have no action at their disposal that best defends these preferences irrespective of the other agents' actions.

A corollary of this theorem is Gibbard–Satterthwaite theorem about voting rules. The main difference between the two is that Gibbard–Satterthwaite theorem is limited to ranked (ordinal) voting rules: a voter's action consists in giving a preference ranking over the available options. Gibbard's theorem is more general and considers processes of collective decision that may not be ordinal: for example, voting systems where voters assign grades to candidates (cardinal voting).  Gibbard's theorem can be proven using Arrow's impossibility theorem.

Gibbard's theorem is itself generalized by Gibbard's 1978 theorem and Hylland's theorem, which extend these results to non-deterministic processes, i.e. where the outcome may not only depend on the agents' actions but may also involve an element of chance. The Gibbard's theorem assumes the collective decision results in exactly one winner and does not apply to multi-winner voting.

Overview 
Assume they use approval voting: each voter assigns to each candidate the grade 1 (approval) or 0 (withhold approval). For example,  is an authorized ballot: it means that the voter approves of candidates  and  but does not approve of candidate . Once the ballots are collected, the candidate with highest total grade is declared the winner.

Assume that voter  prefers alternative , then  and then . Which ballot will best defend her opinions? For example, consider the two following situations.
To sum up, voter  faces a strategic voting dilemma: depending on the ballots that the other voters will cast,  or  can be a ballot that best defends her opinions. We then say that approval voting is not strategyproof: once the voter has identified her own preferences, she does not have a ballot at her disposal that best defends her opinions in all situations; she needs to act strategically, possibly by spying over the other voters to determine how they intend to vote.

Gibbard's theorem states that a deterministic process of collective decision cannot be strategyproof, except possibly in two cases: if there is a distinguished agent who has a dictatorial power, or if the process limits the outcome to two possible options only.

Formal statement 
Let  be the set of alternatives, which can also be called candidates in a context of voting. Let  be the set of agents, which can also be called players or voters, depending on the context of application. For each agent , let  be a set that represents the available strategies for agent ; assume that  is finite. Let  be a function that, to each -tuple of strategies , maps an alternative. The function  is called a game form. In other words, a game form is essentially defined like an n-player game, but with no utilities associated to the possible outcomes: it describes the procedure only, without specifying a priori the gain that each agent would get from each outcome.

This property is desirable for a democratic decision process: it means that once the agent  has identified her own preferences , she can choose a strategy  that best defends her preferences, with no need to know or guess the strategies chosen by the other agents.

Since the strategy sets are finite,  is finite also; thus, even if the set of alternatives  is not assumed to be finite, the subset of possible outcomes  is necessarily so.

Examples

Serial dictatorship 
We assume that each voter communicates a strict weak order over the candidates. The serial dictatorship is defined as follows. If voter 1 has a unique most-liked candidate, then this candidate is elected. Otherwise, possible outcomes are restricted to his ex-aequo most-liked candidates and the other candidates are eliminated. Then voter 2's ballot is examined: if he has a unique best-liked candidate among the non-eliminated ones, then this candidate is elected. Otherwise, the list of possible outcomes is reduced again, etc. If there is still several non-eliminated candidates after all ballots have been examined, then an arbitrary tie-breaking rule is used.

This game form is strategyproof: whatever the preferences of a voter, he has a dominant strategy that consists in declaring his sincere preference order. It is also dictatorial, and its dictator is voter 1: if he wishes to see candidate  elected, then he just has to communicate a preference order where  is the unique most-liked candidate.

Simple majority vote 
If there are only 2 possible outcomes, a game form may be strategyproof and not dictatorial. For example, it is the case of the simple majority vote: each voter casts a ballot for her most-liked alternative (among the two possible outcomes), and the alternative with most votes is declared the winner. This game form is strategyproof because it is always optimal to vote for one's most-liked alternative (unless one is indifferent between them). However, it is clearly not dictatorial. Many other game forms are strategyproof and not dictatorial: for example, assume that the alternative  wins if it gets two thirds of the votes, and  wins otherwise.

A game form showing that the converse does not hold 
Consider the following game form. Voter 1 can vote for a candidate of her choice, or she can abstain. In the first case, the specified candidate is automatically elected. Otherwise, the other voters use a classic voting rule, for example the Borda count. This game form is clearly dictatorial, because voter 1 can impose the result. However, it is not strategyproof: the other voters face the same issue of strategic voting as in the usual Borda count. Thus, Gibbard's theorem is an implication and not an equivalence.

Notes and references

See also
Arrow's impossibility theorem
Gibbard–Satterthwaite theorem

Voting theory
Economics theorems
Theorems in discrete mathematics
Social choice theory